Kurdujin Khatun (prior to 1273–1338) was an Ilkhanid princess, ruler of Kerman in 1295–1296 and of Shiraz in 1319–1338.

Life 
She was born to Abish Khatun and Möngke Temür, the son of Hulagu Khan.

First Marriage 
Her marriage to Suyurgatmish of Kerman, a Khitan ruler, helped her new husband gain many allies, including Suqunjaq Noyan (governor of Iraq), Khuzestan, and Qutui Khatun, the mother of Tekuder. Suyurgatmish was confirmed as the new ruler of Kerman by Tekuder in 1282. 

Kurdujin further extended her influence when she inherited her mother's estate in 1286.  However, after Gaykhatu's coronation, the political climate suddenly changed and Padishah Khatun, who became the ruler of Kerman, imprisoned Suyurgatmish. Kurdujin helped her husband to escape, but he was captured and executed on August 21, 1294.

Struggle against Padishah Khatun 
Kurdujin Khatun got revenge when Baydu, the son-in-law of Suyurgatmish, ascended to the throne. Baydu demanded that Padishah Khatun come to his coronation ceremony. After gathering allies, Kurdujin invaded Kerman and besieged the city.  Around the same time, some of Padishah Khatun's emirs changed loyalties to Kurdujin. These included Emir Timur, Emir Shadi, Emir Mubarek, and her nephew, Nasrat al-Din Yulukshah. 

Padishah Khatun finally surrendered the city and sent the keys to Kurdujin. Padishah was imprisoned and later accused of treason. Kurdujin Khatun obtained the order to execute Padishah Khatun from Baydu thanks to her stepdaughter, Shah Alam. Padishah was executed on the spot near Kushk-e Zar in June/July 1295.

After her victorious entrance, Kurdujin Khatun ruled Kerman. However she was soon replaced by Muzaffar al-Din Mohammad, Muzaffar al-Din Hajjaj's son in 1295, on order of Ghazan, the new Ilkhan.

Later Life 
She lived a quiet life in Shiraz for some time. 

She gave refuge to her stepson Qutb al-Din Shah Jahan in 1306 when he was depraved of ruling Kerman by Öljeitü. 

In 1319 she ruled Shiraz in her own right on the order of Abu Said. 

She died in 1338 and was succeeded by her niece Sultan Khatun in Shiraz.

Marriages 
She had many marriages throughout her life:

 Suyurgatmish (ended in 1294) – Ruler of Kerman
 Amir Taj al-Din Satilmish, formerly a supporter of Kutlugh Turkan.  
 Toghai, a basqaq who was Satilmish's nephew that arrived at Fars in 1320. 
 Amir Chupan (ended in 1327) with whom she had 3 sons:
 Siukshah
 Yagi Basti
 Nowruz

Abu Said promised to marry her to Ghiyath-uddin ibn Rukn-uddin, the Kartid ruler of Herat, but Baghdad Khatun prevented this move.

Legacy 
She was mentioned in works of historian Wassaf, who praised her for being charitable. She also founded the Madrasa-i Shahi (Royal College) in Shiraz.

Ancestors

References 

13th-century births
1338 deaths
Mongol rulers
Women of the Mongol Empire
Borjigin
Ilkhanate
14th-century women rulers
Chobanids
13th-century Mongolian women
14th-century Mongolian women
Qutlugh-Khanids